The 1989 NCAA Division I Men's Ice Hockey Tournament was the culmination of the 1988–89 NCAA Division I men's ice hockey season, the 42nd such tournament in NCAA history. It was held between March 17 and April 1, 1989, and concluded with Harvard defeating Minnesota 4-3 in overtime. All First Round and Quarterfinals matchups were held at home team venues with the 'Frozen Four' games being played at the St. Paul Civic Center in St. Paul, Minnesota.

Qualifying teams
The NCAA permitted 12 teams to qualify for the tournament and divided its qualifiers into two regions (East and West). Each of the tournament champions from the four Division I conferences (CCHA, ECAC, Hockey East and WCHA) received automatic invitations into the tournament with At-large bids making up the remaining 8 teams. The NCAA permitted one Independent team to participate in the tournament and because the previous year the independent qualifier was placed in the West pool the two eastern conferences (ECAC and Hockey East) would split only three open spots as opposed to the West's four open spots. The top four remaining western teams and the top three remaining eastern teams received invitations and were seeded with the automatic qualifiers according to their ranking.

Format
The tournament featured four rounds of play. The three odd-number ranked teams from one region were placed into a bracket with the three even-number ranked teams of the other region. The teams were then seeded according to their ranking with the top two teams in each bracket receiving byes into the quarterfinals. In the first round the third and sixth seeds and the fourth and fifth seeds played best-of-three series to determine which school advanced to the Quarterfinals with the winners of the 4 vs. 5 series playing the first seed and the winner of the 3 vs. 6 series playing the second seed. In the Quarterfinals the matches were best-of-three series once more with the victors advancing to the National Semifinals. Beginning with the Semifinals all games were played at the St. Paul Civic Center and all series became Single-game eliminations. The winning teams in the semifinals advanced to the National Championship Game.

Tournament Bracket

Note: * denotes overtime period(s)

First round

(E3) St. Lawrence vs. (W6) Wisconsin

(E4) Boston College vs. (W5) Bowling Green

(W3) Lake Superior State vs. (E6) St. Cloud State

(W4) Northern Michigan vs. (E5) Providence

Quarterfinals

(E1) Maine vs. (E5) Providence

(E2) Harvard vs. (W3) Lake Superior State

(W1) Michigan State vs. (E4) Boston College

(W2) Minnesota vs. (W6) Wisconsin

Frozen Four

National Semifinal

(W1) Michigan State vs. (E2) Harvard

(E1) Maine vs. (W2) Minnesota

Consolation Game

(E1) Maine vs. (W1) Michigan State

National Championship

(W2) Minnesota vs. (E2) Harvard

All-Tournament Team
G: Allain Roy (Harvard)
D: Todd Richards (Minnesota)
D: Kevin Sneddon (Harvard)
F: Jon Anderson (Minnesota)
F: Ted Donato* (Harvard)
F: Lane MacDonald (Harvard)
* Most Outstanding Player(s)

References

Tournament
NCAA Division I men's ice hockey tournament
NCAA Division I Men's Ice Hockey Tournament
NCAA Division I Men's Ice Hockey Tournament
NCAA Division I Men's Ice Hockey Tournament
NCAA Division I Men's Ice Hockey Tournament
NCAA Division I Men's Ice Hockey Tournament
NCAA Division I Men's Ice Hockey Tournament
NCAA Division I Men's Ice Hockey Tournament
NCAA Division I Men's Ice Hockey Tournament
1980s in Minneapolis
20th century in Saint Paul, Minnesota
Ice hockey competitions in Maine
Ice hockey competitions in Boston
Ice hockey competitions in Michigan
Ice hockey competitions in Minneapolis
Ice hockey competitions in New York (state)
Ice hockey competitions in Saint Paul, Minnesota
Sports competitions in East Lansing, Michigan
Marquette, Michigan
Sports in Orono, Maine
Sault Ste. Marie, Michigan
St. Lawrence County, New York